Crystal Quade (born 1985/1986) is an American politician who serves as a Democrat in the Missouri House of Representatives. She currently serves as the House Minority Leader.

Early life
Quade was the first person in her immediate family to graduate from high school.  She graduated from Missouri State University with a bachelor's degree in social work. Quade developed a strong interest in politics after taking a college course in policy, and, after graduating from college, Quade worked as a legislative staff member for then-U.S. Senator Claire McCaskill. Prior to being elected to a seat in the Missouri House of Representatives, Quade was the former chapter services director of Care to Learn, a non-profit organization that provides funding to address health, hunger, and hygiene needs of schoolchildren in multiple Missouri public school districts.

Electoral career
In 2016, then-Missouri State Representative Charlie Norr did not seek re-election. Two Democrats, two Republicans, and one Libertarian filed to run in the 2016 race in the 132nd Missouri state representative district. Quade defeated Bob Sweere in the Democratic primary to win the Democratic nomination, and Quade defeated Republican nominee Thomas Quinn and Libertarian nominee Chris Burros by receiving 5,215 votes to Quinn's 4,243 votes to Burros's 521 votes.

In 2018, Quade ran for re-election in the 132nd Missouri state representative district, winning the Democratic primary unopposed and running against Republican nominee Sarah Semple in the general election. Quade was re-elected by receiving 5,383 votes to Semple's 2,982 votes.

Legislative career
As a state legislator, Quade serves on the Budget Committee and the Committee on Government Efficiencies, as well as the Missouri General Assembly's Joint Committee on Child Abuse and Neglect. In September 2017, less than a full year after being sworn into office, Quade was elected vice chairperson of the minority caucus of the Missouri House of Representatives by her Democratic colleagues.

Following the 2018 state legislative elections in Missouri, Quade was elected Minority Leader of the Missouri House of Representatives for the 2019 Missouri legislative session.

References

External links
 Official Missouri House of Representatives website for Crystal Quade

21st-century American politicians
21st-century American women politicians
Living people
Democratic Party members of the Missouri House of Representatives
Missouri State University alumni
Politicians from Springfield, Missouri
Women state legislators in Missouri
Year of birth missing (living people)